Virginie Claes (born 17 December 1982 in Herk-de-Stad, Limburg) is television and radio presenter and a former beauty pageant title-holder.

Biography 
Claes was Miss Limburg 2006 and later that year she was crowned Miss Belgium.

She later became a television and radio presenter, including for French-language channels RTL-TVI and Bel RTL.

References

External links 
Miss Limburg - Virginie Claes

Living people
People from Limburg (Belgium)
Belgian female models
1982 births
Miss World 2006 delegates
Belgian beauty pageant winners
Miss Belgium winners
Flemish models